Events during the year 1933 in  Northern Ireland.

Incumbents
 Governor - 	 The Duke of Abercorn 
 Prime Minister - James Craig

Events
31 January–7 April - A strike disrupts rail transport in Northern Ireland. The Castlederg and Victoria Bridge Tramway ceases operation permanently.
24 May – Silent Valley Reservoir (for Belfast water supply) is officially opened.
31 May
First regular civil air service from Northern Ireland, to Renfrew.
Royal Courts of Justice, Belfast, opened by the Governor of Northern Ireland, James Hamilton, 3rd Duke of Abercorn.
18 July – Craigavon Bridge in Derry is officially opened.
Harry Ferguson assembles a prototype tractor in Belfast.

Sport

Football
Irish League
Winners: Belfast Celtic

Irish Cup
Winners: Glentoran 3 - 1 Distillery

GAA
 Cavan defeat Tyrone 6–13 to 1–02 to win the Ulster Senior Football Championship.
 Cavan subsequently defeat Galway 2–05 to 1–04 to win the All-Ireland Senior Football Championship, becoming the first county from Ulster to do so.

Births
14 February – James Simmons, poet, literary critic and songwriter (died 2001).
7 March – Jackie Blanchflower, footballer (died 1998).
14 April – Paddy Hopkirk, rally driver (died 2022).
15 May – Dick Keith, footballer (died 1967).
13 June – Tom King, Baron King of Bridgwater, 8th Secretary of State for Northern Ireland.
28 June – Gusty Spence, Ulster Volunteer Force and Progressive Unionist Party figure.
5 July – Maurice Leitch, novelist and radio dramatist.
5 December – Edward Daly, former Catholic Bishop of Derry.
Grant "Rusty" Ferguson, Sr., actor in The Blue Lagoon (1949 film) (born in Cookstown).
Paddy Wilson, SDLP politician (murdered 1973).

Deaths
January - Bowman Malcolm, railway engineer (born 1854).

See also
1933 in Scotland
1933 in Wales

References